Alejandra Beatriz Alonso Aldrete (born 1 October 1996) is a Paraguayan rower. She competed in the 2020 Summer Olympics.

References

External links
 
 
 

1996 births
Living people
Sportspeople from Asunción
Rowers at the 2020 Summer Olympics
Paraguayan female rowers
Olympic rowers of Paraguay
Rowers at the 2014 Summer Youth Olympics
Pan American Games competitors for Paraguay
Rowers at the 2015 Pan American Games
Rowers at the 2019 Pan American Games
20th-century Paraguayan women
21st-century Paraguayan women